Zachary Augustus Myers (born 1981) is an American lawyer who is the United States attorney for the Southern District of Indiana.

Early life and education 
Myers was born in Stanford, California, and raised in Indiana, the son of Woody Myers, a physician and political candidate. He earned a Bachelor of Arts degree in political science from Stanford University, a Master of Arts in political management from The Graduate School of Political Management in 2003, and a Juris Doctor from the Georgetown University Law Center in 2008.

Career 
From 2003 to 2005, Myers served as a legislative correspondent for Congresswoman Julia Carson. From 2008 to 2011, Myers was an attorney at Baker & Daniels in Indianapolis. He then served as assistant United States attorney for the Southern District of Indiana from 2011 to 2014. He joined the United States District Court for the District of Maryland as assistant U.S. attorney in 2014 and became the district's cybersecurity counsel.

During this time, Myers was promoted and appointed as the Computer Hacking and Intellectual Property (CHIP) prosecutor of the Baltimore Division and the district's national security cybercrime specialist. In July 2018, Myers assisted in formulating the scope and mission of the newly created National Security & Cybercrime Section of the Office of the United States Attorney for the District of Maryland.

United States attorney 

On July 26, 2021, President Joe Biden nominated Myers to be the United States attorney for the Southern District of Indiana. On September 23, 2021, his nomination was reported out of committee. On September 30, 2021, his nomination was confirmed in the United States Senate by voice vote. On November 15, 2021, he was sworn in by Chief Judge Tanya Walton Pratt.

References

External links
 Biography at U.S. Department of Justice

1981 births
Living people
21st-century American lawyers
Assistant United States Attorneys
Georgetown University Law Center alumni
The Graduate School of Political Management alumni
Indiana lawyers
People from Stanford, California
Stanford University alumni
United States Attorneys for the Southern District of Indiana